These are the official results of the Women's 200 metres event at the 1990 European Championships in Split, Yugoslavia, held at Stadion Poljud on 29 and 30 August 1990.

Medalists

Results

Final
30 August
Wind: 0.3 m/s

Semi-finals
30 August

Semi-final 1
Wind: -0.4 m/s

Semi-final 2
Wind: 0.2 m/s

Heats
29 August

Heat 1
Wind: -0.7 m/s

Heat 2
Wind: -0.5 m/s

Heat 3
Wind: 0.2 m/s

Participation
According to an unofficial count, 22 athletes from 11 countries participated in the event.

 (3)
 (1)
 (3)
 (2)
 (2)
 (1)
 (1)
 (2)
 (1)
 (3)
 (3)

See also
 1988 Women's Olympic 200 metres (Seoul)
 1991 Women's World Championships 200 metres (Tokyo)
 1992 Women's Olympic 200 metres (Barcelona)

References

 Results

200
200 metres at the European Athletics Championships
1990 in women's athletics